Pahri may refer to:

Places 
Chak 44/12.L, a village in Sahiwal District, Punjab, Pakistan
 Pahri, an ancient city of Cilicia

Languages 
 Pahari language (Sino-Tibetan), or Pahri, a language of Nepal
 Pahari language (Kashmir), or Pahri, a language of Kashmir

See also 
 Pahari (disambiguation)